Clement is an unincorporated community in Jackson Township in southeastern Sainte Genevieve County, Missouri, United States. It is situated near the Mississippi River, approximately eight miles northwest of Ste. Genevieve. The community was also referred to as Establishment in the past due to its proximity to Establishment Creek and the adjacent Establishment Island in the Mississippi floodplain. A small stream in Staples Hollow joins Establishment Creek at the site.

The current name is derived from the people who had a fishing club at the site. A post office called Clement was established in 1909, and remained in operation until 1911.

References

Unincorporated communities in Ste. Genevieve County, Missouri
Unincorporated communities in Missouri